Eleonora Polynetta (Pauline) Emilia Westdahl, (24 March 1810 - 7 August 1887) was a Swedish author and pioneer within the Swedish awakening movement.

Biography
Eleonora Polynetta Emilia was born 24 March 1810. Her father was the duke Polycarpus Cronhielm (1774-1810) and her mother Anna Margareta Maria Edenhielm. She had five siblings. From 1825 she resided in Jönköping and married a vicar named Carl Magnus Westdahl in 1835. They had six children. The Westdahls led the great awakening in the 1840 in Jönköping, they started the sobriety movements with Pauline Westdahl as manager for the Bible study group created by the United Bible Societies.

In 1848, her husband became the vicar of Karlshamn and Asarum. After his death in 1865 Westdahl lived in Stockholm as a vicar's widow with a yearly pension of 200 (SEK). To make a living, she had to rent out rooms, and translated articles for and wrote for local newspapers. She released her first novel, Rosor och törnen, in 1873 at the age of 63. Earlier, she had published a book on sobriety and the hurtful nature of alcohol.

Bibliography
Drinkaren och hans dotter: Nykterhets-och folkskrift tillegnad i synnerhet mina landsmanninnor i hyddan, af en svensk medborgarinna, 1841.
Rebeckas nej: Nykterhets-och folkskrift, tillegnad i synnerhet Smålands ungdom af förf. till "Drinkaren och hans dotter", 1843
Rosor och törnen: svenskt original,  1873
De fyra önskningarne : berättelse, 1873
Margareta Kling eller En ros vid vägen, 1875
Ett treblad för julen, 1882
De sörjandes vän: Några trösteord utgifna trettio år efter författarinnans död af Ellen Tretow, född Westdahl, 1925

References 

1810 births
1887 deaths
People from Jönköping
19th-century Swedish writers
19th-century Swedish women writers